Mortal City is Dar Williams' second album, released in January 1996 by Razor & Tie.

The songs "As Cool as I Am" and "The Christians and the Pagans" were released as singles in 1996; the former was also accompanied by a music video.  Unlike Williams' previous album, The Honesty Room, which was entirely acoustic, Mortal City featured electric backup on a number of the album's songs, particularly "The Ocean" and "The Blessings".

Joan Baez covered the song "February" on the album Gone from Danger.

Track listing
All songs written by Dar Williams, except where noted.
"As Cool As I Am" – 3:35
"February" – 3:51
"Iowa (Travelling III)" – 4:46
"The Christians and the Pagans" – 3:03
"This Was Pompeii" – 3:53
"The Ocean" – 5:16
"Family" (Pierce Pettis) – 3:22
"The Pointless, Yet Poignant, Crisis of a Co-Ed" – 3:12
"The Blessings" – 3:50
"Southern California Wants To Be Western New York" – 4:08
"Mortal City" – 7:15

Personnel
Dar Williams – vocals (all tracks), guitar (2-11)
William Galison – harmonica (1), mandolin (4)
Larry Campbell – guitar (1,3,10), dobro (3), fiddle (7), mandolin (10)
Mark Egan – bass (1)
Art Baron – digeridoo (1)
Sammy Merendino – rhythm textures (1)
Roger Squitero – bongos (1)
Katryna Nields – vocals (1)
Nerissa Nields – vocals (1)
Erik Friedlander – cello (2,11)
Cliff Eberhardt – vocals (3)
Lucy Kaplansky – vocals (4)
Zev Katz – bass (4,6,9)
Billy Ward – snare drum (4), drums (6,9)
Mark Shulman – electric guitar (5)
John Prine – vocals (6)
Jeff Golub – electric guitar (6,9)
Eileen Ivers – fiddle (6)
Gideon Freudmann – cello (8)
Steve Gaboury – piano (11), textures (11)

References

External links
Lyrics and tabs (for all Dar Williams albums)

1996 albums
Dar Williams albums
Razor & Tie albums